Jinshan Temple is a Buddhist temple located in Qibin District of Hebi, Henan, China. Jinshan Temple is the birthplace of the Chinese legend Legend of the White Snake (Madame White Snake).

History
Jinshan Temple was first built in the Tang dynasty (618–907) and rebuilt in the Jiayou period (1056–1063) of the Northern Song dynasty (960–1127). In the reign of Emperor Huizong (1341–1370) of the Yuan dynasty (1271–1368), the emperor issued the decree rebuilding the temple.

Jinshan Temple was officially reopened to the public in 2004.

References

Buddhist temples in Henan
Buildings and structures in Hebi
Tourist attractions in Hebi